Skrapar District was one of the 36 districts of Albania, which were dissolved in July 2000 and replaced by 12 newly created counties. It was in the centre of the country, and its capital was the town of Çorovodë. Its territory is now part of Berat County: the municipalities of Skrapar and Poliçan (partly).

Administrative divisions
The district consisted of the following municipalities:
Bogovë
Çepan
Çorovodë
Gjerbës
Leshnjë
Poliçan
Potom
Qendër Skrapar
Vëndreshë
Zhepë

Notable people
Abas Ermenji, Albanian politician and historian
Riza Cerova, Albanian political figure 
Xhelal bej Koprencka, modern Albania's founding father
Ilir Meta, Albanian politician

Gallery

References

External links
Berat County Travel Guide

Districts of Albania
Geography of Berat County